2016–17 Liga Națională may refer to the following competitions in Romania:
2016–17 Liga Națională (men's basketball)
2016–17 Liga Națională (women's basketball)
2016–17 Liga Națională (men's handball)
2016–17 Liga Națională (women's handball)